The Redwood Creek Challenge Trail is a forest-themed play area at Disney California Adventure. It features a network of trails simulating a trail in a redwood forest, a large network of stairs and rope bridges, a traverse rock climbing wall, a zip line, side-by-side slides, and an amphitheater. Explorers can also visit the "Kenai's Spirit Cave" to find what spirit animal represents them (bear, wolf, eagle, moose, salmon, and skunk). 

The area was one of the park's original attractions, and opened to the public on February 8, 2001. It was later re-themed after the 2003 Disney animated film Brother Bear and featured character meeting areas for characters from the film as well as an amphitheater show called The Magic of Brother Bear. It is currently themed after the 2009 Disney-Pixar film Up, and centered on the Wilderness Explorers, a fictional scouting organization from the film.

References

External links
 Redwood Creek Challenge Trail

Walt Disney Parks and Resorts attractions
Disney California Adventure
Grizzly Peak (Disney California Adventure)
2001 establishments in California
Up (2009 film)